Adam Wheeler (born March 24, 1981) is an American wrestler, best known for his bronze medal performance at the 2008 Summer Olympics. He is now a coach at Prime BJJ in Colorado Springs.

References 

1981 births
Living people
Olympic bronze medalists for the United States in wrestling
Medalists at the 2008 Summer Olympics
Wrestlers at the 2008 Summer Olympics
American male sport wrestlers